Novohryhorivka is an urban settlement in Kramatorsk Raion in Donetsk Oblast of eastern Ukraine. Population:

Demographics
Native language as of the Ukrainian Census of 2001:
 Ukrainian 90.62%
 Russian 8.40%
 Armenian 0.99%

References

Urban-type settlements in Kramatorsk Raion